Saint Asonia (stylized as SΔINT ΔSONIΔ) is a Canadian-American rock supergroup consisting of lead vocalist and rhythm guitarist Adam Gontier, lead guitarist Mike Mushok, bassist and backing vocalist Cale Gontier, and drummer Cody Watkins. In 2017, the band's original drummer, Rich Beddoe, left the band and was replaced by Mushok's Staind bandmate Sal Giancarelli, and one year later bassist and backing vocalist Corey Lowery left the band to join Seether and his place was taken by Gontier's cousin Cale Gontier. The band formed in Toronto, Canada in 2015 after Gontier's departure from Three Days Grace in 2013. Their second studio album, titled Flawed Design, was released on October 25, 2019. On January 26, 2020, Art of Dying drummer Cody Watkins became the new drummer for Saint Asonia replacing Sal Giancarelli.

History

The band released their first teaser early May 2015, which featured the fact that "25 Top Ten Rock Singles" were shared between each member, 17 of which are number ones, and teased the band's first single, logo and clips of the band, speculation believed that the line up would consist of ex-Three Days Grace singer Adam Gontier, former Staind guitarist Mike Mushok, former Finger Eleven drummer Rich Beddoe, and former Dark New Day bassist Corey Lowery, however, nothing was confirmed until May 16 when the band officially released their first single titled "Better Place", confirming the band's line up in the process. When asked about the title of the band, Gontier stated that they are "...more like refugees that just hit it off creatively". Johnny K was secured as the producer for their debut album, which was released on July 31, 2015, along with tour announcements.

The band made their debut live performance at Rock on the Range as the opening act for the main stage on May 16, and were billed as a special guest. Along with their first single, the band performed other original songs such as "Fairy Tale", "Dying Slowly" and "Let Me Live My Life", but also performed cover songs of Three Days Grace, such as "I Hate Everything About You" and songs from Mushok's past band, Staind, like "Mudshovel" and "For You". The band announced that their debut self-titled album would be released on July 31 that same year via RCA Records featuring 11 tracks. The band released their second single, "Blow Me Wide Open", on June 29. Saint Asonia booked a short headlining tour in August 2015, as well as a tour with Seether in the fall of 2015. In February 2016, Saint Asonia joined the first part of the 2016 Disturbed tour, as an opening act.

On May 2, 2016, Saint Asonia released a cover of the Phil Collins song, "I Don't Care Anymore", which was later released in the iTunes Store on May 6, 2016.

On June 5, 2017, drummer Rich Beddoe confirmed that he had left Saint Asonia on good terms to do other things. On July 12, 2017, the band played their first show with Mike Mushok's former Staind bandmate Sal Giancarelli on drums. Lowery departed the band during the summer of 2018 to join Seether full-time and was replaced by Art of Dying bassist and Gontier's cousin Cale Gontier. On February 21, 2019, Saint Asonia announced that they signed with Spinefarm Records and that a follow-up album to their self-titled album was in the works.

On July 24, 2019, the band revealed their single "The Hunted" featuring Sully Erna. The album title was revealed as Flawed Design in interviews conducted immediately after the release of the single. Two months later on September 20, 2019, Saint Asonia released "Beast" and announced the release date of the album.

Flawed Design became available worldwide on October 25, 2019.

On January 26, 2020, it was announced by Adam Gontier that Art of Dying drummer Cody Watkins had joined the band as their new drummer replacing Sal Giancarelli.

On November 18, 2021, the band released a cover of "Blinding Lights" by The Weeknd.

On April 19, 2022, the band teased a new single on their Twitter account with an image taken from (supposedly) the new music video, along with the lyrics "We've been drowning for far too long." Following the release of their latest single "Above it All", they announced an EP titled, Introvert, which was released on July 1, 2022. The entire EP has been released on Spotify with seven songs. It features of cover of The Weeknd's "Blinding Lights". The group announced an upcoming EP, Extrovert that is set to be released on November 18, 2022. In addition, the band released a single called "Wolf" to promote the EP. The band will also be releasing both EPs physically as Introvert/Extrovert with bonus tracks on December 9, 2022.

Band members

Current members
 Adam Gontier – lead vocals, rhythm guitar 
 Mike Mushok – lead guitar 
 Cale Gontier – bass, backing vocals 
 Cody Watkins – drums, percussion 
Former members
 Rich Beddoe – drums, percussion 
 Corey Lowery – bass, backing vocals 
 Sal Giancarelli – drums, percussion 

Timeline

Discography

Studio albums

Compilation albums

Extended plays

Singles

Promotional singles

Music videos

Awards

Loudwire Music Awards

|-
| 2015 || Saint Asonia || Best New Artist of 2015 || 
|}

Canadian Radio Music Awards

|-
| 2016 || "Better Place" || Best New Group or Solo Artist: Mainstream Rock || 
|}

References

External links

 

Musical groups established in 2015
Musical groups from Toronto
Canadian nu metal musical groups
American post-grunge musical groups
Canadian post-grunge groups
American alternative metal musical groups
Canadian alternative metal musical groups
Canadian hard rock musical groups
2015 establishments in Ontario
Musical quartets
Rock music supergroups